I've Ive is the first studio album by South Korean girl group Ive. It is set to be released on April 10, 2023, by Starship Entertainment.

Background
During their first solo concert The Prom Queens, which took place at the Olympic Hall in Seoul on February 11 and 12, the group performed two unreleased songs: "Blue Blood" and "Not Your Girl". It was later reported by Korea JoongAng Daily that both tracks were from Ive's upcoming debut album. On February 17, Starship Entertainment confirmed that Ive was in the process of gearing up to release their first full-length material in April.

Release and promotion
On March 16, teasers were uploaded to the group’s social media accounts, confirming that Ive would be releasing their first studio album, I've Ive, on April 10. It was also shared that the album would be available for pre-order on March 21. On March 20, it was announced that the album's pre-release single would be titled "Kitsch" and released on March 27.

Title
Starship Entertainment explained that the album's title I've Ive "referring to the Ive's name, means that the group will present themselves the 'IVE way' [in the upcoming album]".

References

Ive (group) albums
Korean-language albums
2023 debut albums
Starship Entertainment albums